The Mackinac Center for Public Policy in Midland, Michigan, is the largest U.S. state-based free market think tank in the United States. The Mackinac Center conducts policy research and educational programs. The Center sponsors MichiganVotes.org, an online legislative voting record database which provides a non-partisan summary of every bill and vote in the Michigan legislature. Mackinac Center scholars generally recommend lower taxes, reduced regulatory authority for state agencies, right-to-work laws, school choice, and enhanced protection of individual property rights; they avoid socially conservative issues such as reproductive or marriage rights.

Joseph P. Overton, (1960–2003), a senior vice president of the Mackinac Center, stated the political strategy that later became known as the Overton window. Overton said that politically unpopular, unacceptable policies must be changed into politically acceptable policies before they can be enacted into law. The Center was ranked among the top 5 percent of almost 1,900 think tanks in the United States by the 2018 Global Go To Think Tank Index Report.

History

The organization was founded in 1987. In a 2011 interview, founder Joe Olson said that the Center was first conceived in a Lansing, Michigan bar at a meeting between Olson, fellow insurance company executive Tom Hoeg, Richard McLellan and then-Senator John Engler. Olson said the founders wanted an organization that would focus on research, writing, speaking, issuing press releases and looking at public policy from a free-market point of view.

The Center began operations with no office or full-time staff. It formally opened offices in Midland in 1988 with its first president, Lawrence W. Reed, an economist, writer, and speaker who had chaired the economics department at Northwood University. The Lansing-based Cornerstone Foundation provided early direction and some funding. The Center's first annual budget under Reed was $80,000. In 1999, the Mackinac Center moved from rented offices to its current headquarters after having raised $2.4 million to renovate a former Woolworth's department store on Midland's Main Street.

Reed served as president from the Center's founding until September 2008, when he assumed the title President Emeritus and also became the president of the Foundation for Economic Education. Former Chief Operating Officer Joseph G. Lehman was named the Mackinac Center's president on September 1, 2008.

The Mackinac Center is classified as a 501(c)(3) organization under the U.S. Internal Revenue Code. The Mackinac Center is a member of the State Policy Network, an umbrella organization of conservative and libertarian think tanks operating at the state level. In November 2006 The New York Times published a two-part series about state-based free-market think tanks that described how the Mackinac Center trained think-tank executives from 42 countries and nearly every US state. The New York Times also reported that, "When the Mackinac Center was founded in 1987, there were just three other conservative state-level policy institutes. Now there are 48, in 42 states."

When asked by Detroit's Metro Times in 1996, the Center's President Lawrence Reed said: "Our funding sources are primarily foundations ... with the rest coming from corporations and individuals," but that "... revealing our contributors would be a tremendous diversion..."

In 2002, the Michigan Education Association (MEA) sued the Mackinac Center over the Center's use of a supportive quote by the MEA's President in fundraising material. In 2004, the Michigan Court of Appeals threw out the lawsuit.

In 2014, the organization released a mobile app, VoteSpotter. The app allows users to track votes by elected officials in the United States. It was originally an extension of the organization's MichiganVotes.org website, but has since expanded to include other states.

In 2019, a satellite office was opened in Lansing, Michigan.

Principles
The Mackinac Center prefers the term "free market" over "conservative", because it does not address social issues such as abortion, censorship, and gambling. The Center writes that its ideology is most accurately characterized as flowing from the "classical liberal tradition" of Milton Friedman and others: "socially tolerant, economically sophisticated, desiring little government intervention in either their personal or economic affairs."

The Mackinac Center was involved in the effort to pass a right-to-work law in Michigan and has supported efforts in other states to expand right to work laws and workers' rights to not pay dues to a union they do not support. The Center also launched the website MyPayMySay.com to alert union members to their rights.

Publications
In addition to policy studies, the Center publishes a number of periodicals including Michigan Education Report, Michigan Privatization Report, Michigan Science, Michigan Capitol Confidential, Impact, Michigan Education Digest and Michigan Context and Performance Report Card.

Personnel

Policy staff members
 Burton W. Folsom Jr., Senior Fellow in Economic Education
 Lawrence Reed, President Emeritus

Adjunct scholars

 Peter Boettke
 Richard Ebeling
 James Gattuso

 Paul McCracken (1915–2013)
 Robert Murphy
 Mark J. Perry

 Robert Sirico
 Bradley A. Smith
 John B. Taylor

 Richard Vedder
 Gary L. Wolfram

Board of directors
Current members of the Mackinac Center's board of directors include:

 Jim Barrett, Member; President & CEO of the Michigan Chamber of Commerce
 Dulce Fuller, Member; Chair of the Southeast Michigan Committee of The Heritage Foundation
 Daniel Graf, Member; Financial analyst at Amerisure Mutual Holdings
 Richard Haworth, Member; Chairman of Haworth, an office furniture and architectural interior company based in Holland, Michigan
 Kent Herrick, Vice Chairman; President of Thermogy
 J.C. Huizenga, Member; Chairman of and founder of Huizenga Group, Member of the Acton Institute board of trustees
 Joseph Lehman, President; Vice chair of the National Taxpayers Union and a director of the Fairness Center
 Edward Levy, Member; President of Edw. C. Levy Co.
 Rodney Lockwood, Member; Chairman/CEO of the Lockwood Companies
 Joseph Maguire, Treasurer; President of Wolverine Development Corporation
 Richard D. McLellan, Secretary; McLellan Law Offices; formerly Dykema Gossett Law Firm
 D. Joseph Olson, Member; retired from Amerisure
 Clifford Taylor, Chairman; Chief Justice of the Michigan Supreme Court from 2005 through 2009

Former members of the organization's board include:

 Robert Teeter, Republican pollster and political campaign strategist
 Paul V. Gadola, United States District Judge
 Lawrence Reed, President Emeritus of the Mackinac Center and president of the Foundation for Economic Education

References

External links
 Mackinac Center's official website
 Organizational Profile, National Center for Charitable Statistics (Urban Institute)
MichiganWorkerFreedom.org
Michigan Capitol Confidential

 
501(c)(3) organizations
Libertarianism in the United States
Midland, Michigan
Organizations based in Michigan
Political and economic think tanks in the United States
Think tanks established in 1987
Libertarian organizations based in the United States